Andy Slater (born 1974) is an English male former track cyclist.

Cycling career
Slater was a British track champion after winning the British National Individual Sprint Championships in 2002. He won a silver medal as part of the England team sprint with Jamie Staff and Jason Queally at the 2002 Commonwealth Games.

References

1974 births
British male cyclists
British track cyclists
Commonwealth Games medallists in cycling
Commonwealth Games silver medallists for England
Living people
Cyclists at the 2002 Commonwealth Games
21st-century British people
Medallists at the 2002 Commonwealth Games